Mvula ya Nangolo (9 August 1943 – 25 April 2019) was a Namibian journalist and poet.

He was born in Oniimwandi on 9 August 1943 and grew up in Lüderitz and later Windhoek. He joined the independence movement SWAPO at the age of 18 and later moved to Germany on a journalism scholarship. He was the first editor of Namibia Today and worked as a Special Advisor to the Ministry of Information and Communication Technology. He died on 25 April 2019 in Tauben Glen, Windhoek as a result of complications from a stroke.

In the poem Namibia he said :

"My heart opens up when I am in the mountains

Where I can be alone with my thoughts

I’ve returned here to be in the deserts

I love to hear the sound made by sand dunes".

References

1943 births
2019 deaths
Namibian journalists
Namibian poets
People from Oshana Region
20th-century Namibian writers
21st-century Namibian writers
Namibian expatriates in Germany
People from Lüderitz